Zahwa Ayad Arabi (born 2 November 2005) is a Lebanese footballer who plays as a forward for Lebanese club EFP and the Lebanon national team.

International career
Arabi represented Lebanon U15 at the 2019 WAFF U-15 Championship, winning the tournament.

She made her senior international debut for Lebanon on 24 August 2021, as a substitute in a 0–0 draw against Tunisia in the 2021 Arab Women's Cup. Arabi was called up to represent Lebanon at the 2022 WAFF Women's Championship; she helped her side finish runners-up, scoring a goal in a 2–1 defeat to Jordan on 1 September.

Career statistics

International
Scores and results list Lebanon's goal tally first, score column indicates score after each Arabi goal.

Honours 
Lebanon U15
 WAFF U-15 Girls Championship: 2019

Lebanon U18
 WAFF U-18 Girls Championship: 2022

Lebanon
 WAFF Women's Championship runner-up: 2022

See also
 List of Lebanon women's international footballers

References

External links
 

2005 births
Living people
People from Western Beqaa District
Lebanese women's footballers
Women's association football forwards
United Tripoli FC players
Eleven Football Pro players
Lebanese Women's Football League players
Lebanon women's youth international footballers
Lebanon women's international footballers
21st-century Lebanese women